Ichsan Pratama (born 9 October 1993) is an Indonesian professional footballer who plays as a central midfielder for Liga 2 club PSMS Medan.

Club career

Barito Putera
Ichsan joined in the squad for the 2016 Indonesia Soccer Championship A. Ichsan made his debut against Bhayangkara F.C. in first week.

PSPS Pekanbaru
He was signed for PSPS Pekanbaru to play in Liga 2 in the 2017 season. He made 22 league appearances and scored 3 goals for PSPS Pekanbaru.

PSS Sleman
In 2018, Ichsan Pratama signed a one-year contract with Indonesian Liga 2 club PSS Sleman. On 4 December 2018 PSS successfully won the 2018 Liga 2 Final and promoted to Liga 1, after defeated Semen Padang 2–0 at the Pakansari Stadium, Cibinong. He made 28 league appearances and scored 4 goals for PSS Sleman.

PSIM Yogyakarta
He was signed for PSIM Yogyakarta to play in Liga 2 in the 2019 season.

PSMS Medan
In 2021, Ichsan Pratama signed a contract with Indonesian Liga 2 club PSMS Medan. He made his league debut on 7 October against KS Tiga Naga. Ichsan scored his first goal for PSMS in the 49th minute against Tiga Naga at the Gelora Sriwijaya Stadium, Palembang.

Career statistics

Club

Honours 
PSS Sleman
 Liga 2: 2018
Individual
 Liga 2 Best Player: 2018

References

External links
 
 Ichsan Pratama at Liga Indonesia

1992 births
Indonesian footballers
Living people
Association football midfielders
PSIM Yogyakarta players
PSS Sleman players
PSPS Pekanbaru players
PS Barito Putera players
People from Sukabumi
Sportspeople from West Java
21st-century Indonesian people